During the 2004–05 English football season, Wigan Athletic F.C. competed in the Football League Championship.

Season summary
After only 32 years as a Football League club, Wigan Athletic won promotion to English football's top flight for the first time in their history, by virtue of finishing second. This was also their highest-ever finish in the Football League in their history.

Wigan's league success did not translate to the domestic cup competitions: they only played one match in each cup before being knocked out. This may have turned out to be beneficial to Wigan, as it allowed the club to focus on the league rather than a cup run.

First-team squad
Squad at end of season

Left club during season

Transfers In

Transfers Out

Statistics

Starting 11
Considering starts in all competitions
 GK: #1,  John Filan, 47
 RB: #19,  Nicky Eaden, 34
 CB: #4,  Matt Jackson, 36
 CB: #6,  Ian Breckin, 43
 LB: #26,  Leighton Baines, 42
 RM: #20,  Gary Teale, 30
 CM: #14,  Alan Mahon, 23
 CM: #21,  Jimmy Bullard, 47
 LM: #10,  Lee McCulloch, 43
 CF: #9,  Nathan Ellington, 43
 CF: #30,  Jason Roberts, 46

References

Wigan Athletic F.C. seasons
Wigan Athletic